Dmitry Garanin is a Russian-American physicist known for his work in Theoretical Condensed matter physics. He is a professor in the Department of Physics & Astronomy at Lehman College of The City University of New York and a faculty member in the Physics Department of the Graduate Center, CUNY.

Career 
Garanin attended the Moscow Institute of Physics and Technology from 1972 to 1978, graduating with a B.S. and M.S. in physics. He obtained his Ph.D. in physics from Moscow State University in 1985. Garanin worked in the I. E. Tamm Division of Theoretical Physics of the Lebedev Physical Institute in Moscow, then at the Moscow Technological University (MIREA). In 1992 he emigrated to Germany with his family, where he worked at the University of Hamburg, the Max Planck Institute for the Physics of Complex Systems in Dresden, and at the University of Mainz. In 2005, he became an associate professor at the Department of Physics & Astronomy, Lehman College and a member of the doctoral faculty of the CUNY Graduate Center. He was promoted to full Professor in 2013. Garanin has authored or coauthored over 150 research papers in the field of Solid-State Physics / Magnetism.

Awards and honors
In 2013, Garanin became a Fellow of the American Physical Society.

Selected publications
Garanin, Dmitry A. "Pulse-noise approach for classical spin systems" Phys. Rev. E 95, 013306-(8) (2017). PhysRevE.95.013306
Garanin, Dmitry A. "Uniform and nonuniform thermal switching of magnetic particles" Phys. Rev. B  98, 144425-(12) (2018). PhysRevB.98.144425
Chudnovsky,  Eugene M.; Garanin, Dmitry A. "Topological Order Generated by a Random Field in a 2D Exchange Model" Phys. Rev. Lett. 121, 017201-(5) (2018). PhysRevLett.121.017201
Garanin, Dmitry A.; Jaafar, Reem; Chudnovsky, Eugene M. "Breathing mode of a skyrmion on a lattice" Phys. Rev. B  101, 014418-(11) (2020). PhysRevB.101.014418

References

External links 
 Personal website
 Faculty bio at Lehman College
 

Moscow State University alumni
Living people
20th-century American physicists
21st-century American physicists
Fellows of the American Physical Society
Lehman College faculty
Graduate Center, CUNY faculty
City University of New York faculty
Year of birth missing (living people)